Ruether is a surname

People
 Dutch Ruether, Walter Henry Ruether (1893-1970), U.S. baseball player
 Mike Ruether, Michael Alan Ruether (born 1962), U.S. American football offensive lineman
 Rosemary Radford Ruether (1936-2022), U.S. feminist

See also
 Reuther (surname)